Rockula is a 1990 American comedy horror film directed by Luca Bercovici and written by Bercovici, Jefery Levy, and Chris Ver Weil. Dean Cameron stars as the vampire Ralph LaVie, Toni Basil plays Phoebe LaVie, Ralph's mother, and Thomas Dolby is the villain Stanley. The story centers on a vampire under a curse; the tagline for the film is: "He's a vampire that hasn't scored in 400 years—tonight's the night!".

Bo Diddley plays a supporting role as Axman, the guitarist in Ralph's band, which is incidentally named Rockula. The director of photography was John Schwartzman, later the DP on Seabiscuit and Saving Mr. Banks.

Plot 
Ralph Lavie (Dean Cameron) is a friendly vampire. He's 400 years old and still lives with his mother Phoebe (Toni Basil) who is also a vampire. Ralph is living under a curse. After meeting the girl of his dreams 308 years ago Ralph lost her after she was killed by her jealous boyfriend, a pirate. Since that time, the girl, Mona, has been reincarnated every 22 years, only to fall in love with Ralph and die under exactly the same oddly specific circumstances (killed on Halloween by a rhinestone-peg-legged pirate wielding a giant hambone). Now in 1990, Ralph, weary of the whole thing, vows to stay locked in his room and not meet Mona again until after Halloween, much to the chagrin of his sentient and libidinous reflection (another side effect of the curse).

Ralph meets up with friends at a local bar (including rock legend Bo Diddley) and once again recounts the story of his curse to them. Walking out into the streets he is hit by a car being driven by none other than Mona's latest incarnation, a local singer (Tawny Fere). Immediately warning her off him Ralph runs off, but a portentous dream reinvigorates him to try and save her life now that events have been set in motion. He goes looking for her and discovers a flyer with her band playing at a local club. When he goes to visit her, the two hit it off immediately much to the dismay of Mona's manager/ex-boyfriend, an eccentric mortuary owner named Stanley (Thomas Dolby). After Ralph is unable to adequately say what he does for a living, he states that he's in a band. Realizing that he actually is a decent musician after hundreds of years of piano and guitar lessons, he and his friends start the band Rockula, playing up his vampirism as the band's gimmick. Rockula's first gig is a success and the band quickly becomes a hit. Ralph and Mona start dating and even start collaborating musically, writing songs and filming a video together. Stanley sees this as a threat and seeks the council of a local Psychic, Madame Ben-Wa who reveals that Ralph is a vampire. He begins a plot to kill Ralph and cryogenically freeze Mona using equipment from his mortuary so he'll have her forever.

Ralph and Mona have dinner with Phoebe and her latest beau, which proves awkward as Phoebe makes no secret of her unnaturally long life, referring to things such as George Washington's bedroom prowess and speaking to Mona as if she's known her for years. The evening culminates in an impromptu musical number by Phoebe. On the drive home, rather than have Mona think he and his mother are crazy, he reveals that he is a vampire and tells her the details of the curse. Mona is skeptical until Ralph half-transforms into a bat in front of her. Disturbed by this, Mona drives off and leaves town. Halloween comes and Rockula is scheduled to perform. Stanley appears, dressed as a pirate, with a hambone, having been directed to do so by Madame Ben-Wa. Mona, having admitted that she loves Ralph returns and meets him on stage, only to be kidnapped and carted away by Stanley, who prepares to place her in the cryogenic freezing chamber. Ralph's reflection tells him where to find Mona and he comes to the rescue. Stanley and Ralph duel with Stanley wielding the hambone and Ralph wielding the rhinestone peg-leg. Madame Ben-Wa is then revealed to be Phoebe, who has orchestrated the curse for years, scared that Ralph will leave the nest. Phoebe apologizes, realizing that she needs to let Ralph grow up, but is knocked out by Stanley. Ralph then again half-transforms into a bat, scaring Stanley into falling into his own freezing chamber. Having saved Mona's life the curse is broken, and the two leave the club together happily.

Ralph's reflection has had enough and smashes his way out of the mirror dressed as Elvis Presley in a rhinestone jumpsuit and performs a final number as Rockula.

Production
Principal filming for Rockula was actually completed in 1988. At the time, both New World and Cannon Pictures were filing for bankruptcy. Consequently, several of the films that the two companies made which were ready for release got shelved. The films made by New World eventually found decent distribution and their film Warlock actually wound up being a huge hit on home video. Cannon's Rockula however, only played a few theatres before being dumped on video in August 1990, where it remained largely ignored.

Cast

See also
 Vampire film

References

External links
 
 

1990 films
1990s comedy horror films
1990s musical films
American comedy horror films
Golan-Globus films
Vampire comedy films
1990 comedy films
Films directed by Luca Bercovici
1990s English-language films
1990s American films